Hazipur Union is a union parishad situated at Magura Sadar Upazila,  in Magura District, Khulna Division of Bangladesh. There are 10 villages and 9 mouzas in the union.

References

External links
 

Unions of Khulna Division
Unions of Magura Sadar Upazila
Unions of Magura District